Zur See is a 9-part television series, produced by the GDR television from 1974 to 1976. It covers the journey of the German Sea Seafarers' Training and Freightship, J. G. Fichte from Rostock to Havana. Many prominent actors of the GDR had been committed to this series for the main roles. Horst Drinda, Günter Naumann, Günter Schubert and Erik S. Klein were among the most popular actors of their time. The series became one of the most successful and most-watched productions on the GDR television.

The nine episodes had different running times on television and ranged between 60 and 75 minutes, depending on the production. Their first broadcast was on a Friday evening at 8 pm on GDR television.

In the nine episodes, the everyday life and the professional situations of a shipyard of the GDR's socialist merchant fleet, from the captain to the decksman on their ship, are portrayed between sea and land, essentially based on actual events. But also the problems within families of two captains and the normal other interpersonal problems arising from long separation from the families are treated. The friendship with the socialist maritime states such as the People's Republic of Poland and the Soviet Union is also described.

See also
List of German television series

External links
 

1977 German television series debuts
1977 German television series endings
Nautical television series
German-language television shows
Works set on ships
Television in East Germany